Jānis Polis (12 January 1893 – 29 September 1953) was a Latvian wrestler. He competed for Russia at the 1912 Summer Olympics and for Latvia at the 1924 Summer Olympics.

References

External links
 
 

1893 births
1953 deaths
People from Burtnieki Municipality
People from the Governorate of Livonia
Latvian male sport wrestlers
Olympic wrestlers of Latvia
Olympic wrestlers of Russia
Wrestlers at the 1912 Summer Olympics
Wrestlers at the 1924 Summer Olympics
Russian male sport wrestlers